Tyrawka (also: Tyrawski Potok) is a right tributary of the San River in southeastern Poland. It is 23 kilometres long, and flows into the San near Tyrawa Solna.

Rivers of Poland
Rivers of Podkarpackie Voivodeship